Xiao Hou may refer to:

Hsiao Ho (actor) (born 1958), Hong Kong actor
Marquis Xiao (disambiguation)
Empress Xiao (disambiguation)